Askeran ( or ,) is a town de facto in the Republic of Artsakh as the administrative centre of its Askeran Province, de jure in the Khojaly District of Azerbaijan, in the disputed region of Nagorno-Karabakh. It is located on the left bank of the Karkar River (Qarqarçay), approximately 7 miles northeast of the regional capital, Stepanakert. The town has an ethnic Armenian-majority population, and also had an Armenian majority in 1989.

History 

The Askeran Fortress (Mayraberd), built by the Karabakh Khanate ruler Panah Ali Khan in 1751, is situated in the southern part of the town. Armenian historian Shahen Mkrtchyan writes that the Askeran fortress was built upon the foundations of the medieval Armenian village and fortress known as Mayraberd. During the Russo-Persian War of 1804–1813 the Russian encampment was near the fortress. In 1810, peace talks between the Russians and Persians were conducted at the fortress. Restoration works on the fortress began in 2018.

In the Russian Empire, Askeran was part of the Shusha Uyezd in the Elisabethpol Governorate. During the Soviet period, the city was the administrative center of the Askeran District, which was a part of the Nagorno-Karabakh Autonomous Oblast in the Azerbaijan SSR.

Askeran was the site of one of the starting points of the Nagorno-Karabakh conflict in 1988, the Askeran clash. On 22 February 1988, a crowd of angry Azerbaijanis marched from Agdam in the direction of Stepanakert and clashed with police and local Armenians in Askeran, ending in the death of two Azerbaijanis and injuries on both sides. The town was known as an Armenian stronghold during the war. In 1991, it became the center of the Askeran Province of the Republic of Artsakh following the First Nagorno-Karabakh War.

Historical heritage sites 
Historical heritage sites in and around Askeran include the 18th-century Askeran Fortress, the cave-shrine of Hatsut, and the church of Surb Astvatsatsin built in 2002.

Economy and culture 
The population is engaged in agriculture, horticulture, animal husbandry as well as in different state institutions and other private enterprises. The city is home to factories producing wine, brandy and non-alcoholic drinks, as well as architectural enterprises, secondary and musical schools, a house of culture, a municipal building, a kindergarten, and a hospital. The community of Askeran includes the village of Kyatuk.

Demographics 
In 1970 Askeran was estimated to have around 700 inhabitants, mostly ethnic Armenians, per the 2005 census there were 1,967 inhabitants, and in 2015 the town was estimated to have 2,300 inhabitants.

Gallery

References

External links 

 

Populated places in Askeran Province
Cities and towns in the Republic of Artsakh
Populated places in Khojaly District